Eskin is a village in the Kızıltepe District of Mardin Province in Turkey. The village is populated by Arabs of the Tat tribe and by Kurds of the Barava tribe. It had a population of 1,761 in 2021.

References 

Villages in Kızıltepe District
Kurdish settlements in Mardin Province
Arab settlements in Mardin Province